Life After Death is the debut studio album of Natas, released in 1992.

Controversy 

Following the release of this album, Esham, Natas and Reel Life Productions were the subject of much controversy when a 17-year-old fan killed himself while smoking cannabis and playing Russian roulette while listening to Life After Death.

Reception 
Allrovi reviewer Jason Birchmeier wrote that "The trio's attempt to be as hardcore as possible pushes their efforts from shocking to clichéd satire. Furthermore, in addition to the clichéd subject matter, the accompanying music isn't nearly as evocative as that found on Esham's solo albums. The group's later albums would eventually integrate a further sense of sincerity and less theatrics as well as a stronger musical soundtrack; this debut finds them simply trying to make a splash by being as insane as possible."

Track listing

References

1992 debut albums
Albums produced by Esham
Natas (group) albums
Reel Life Productions albums